Altica tamaricis is a species of flea beetle from the family of leaf beetles that can be found everywhere in Europe and Near East.

References

Beetles described in 1785
Beetles of Europe
Alticini
Taxa named by Franz von Paula Schrank